Merghindeal is a commune located in Sibiu County, Transylvania,  Romania. It is composed of two villages, Dealu Frumos (formerly Șulumberg; Schönberg; Lesses) and Merghindeal. Each of these has a fortified church.

The commune lies at the southern edge of the Transylvanian Plateau.

At the 2011 census, 78.8% of inhabitants were Romanians, 17% Roma, 2.7% Hungarians, and 1.4% Germans (more specifically Transylvanian Saxons).

References 

Communes in Sibiu County
Localities in Transylvania